The Augsburg Lutheran Churches is a moderate-to-conservative confessional Lutheran denomination in the United States.

History
The Augsburg Lutheran Churches was formed in 2001 in response to the Called to Common Mission, an agreement between the Episcopal Church and the Evangelical Lutheran Church in America in the United States, establishing full communion between them. This agreement's most controversial element was a move towards episcopacy, having a bishopric with full apostolic succession.

The founders of the Augsburg Lutheran Churches believed that the Augsburg Confession (1530), considered the founding document of Lutheranism, holds that ordination is not a sacrament, but a human ceremony. Thus its observance need not be uniform across the church. In 2003, the Augsburg Lutheran District reorganized as a separate denomination and adopted its present name, the Augsburg Lutheran Churches.

The Augsburg Lutheran Churches works together with the Lutheran Congregations in Mission for Christ, and some of its congregations have joint membership in both bodies. It also enjoys a cordial relationship with the North American Lutheran Church. Its official seminary is the Institute of Lutheran Theology.

Beliefs
The Augsburg Lutheran Churches has a very simple doctrinal statement with a set of affirmative and negative theses titled 'Our Declaration'. The topics covered are:

1) The Trinity: Our Great Heritage

2) The Cross: Where we begin

3) Sin and Death: Our Problem

4) The Word of the Cross: God’s Answer

5) Mission and Church: God’s Action in this World

6) The Christian Life: God’s Action in this World

References

External links
 Official website

See also

Confessing Movement
Lutheran CORE
WordAlone

Lutheran denominations
Lutheran denominations in North America
2001 establishments in Iowa